The 2020–21 Leicester City W.F.C. season was the club's 17th season and their third in the FA Women's Championship, the second level of the women's football pyramid. Outside of the league, the club also contested two domestic cup competitions: the FA Cup and the League Cup.

It was their first under the official ownership of Leicester City F.C. parent group, King Power, having previously been an independent club with a formal affiliation to the Foxes. The takeover was confirmed on 22 August 2020 with the club immediately becoming fully-professional in the process. On 22 December 2020, the club announced the women's team would move in to the Belvoir Drive training ground before the end of the year after the men's team vacated the facility and relocated to a newly-constructed complex in Seagrave.

On 4 April 2021, Leicester City clinched the league title with a 2–0 win over London City Lionesses, their twelfth consecutive league victory dating back to 4–1 defeat at the hands of the same opposition on 1 November 2020. The result earned Leicester their first ever promotion to the top-flight FA WSL.

Squad

FA Women's Championship

Results summary

Results

League table

Women's FA Cup 

As a member of the top two tiers, Leicester City will enter the FA Cup in the fourth round proper. Originally scheduled to take place on 31 January 2021, it was delayed due to COVID-19 restrictions. Due to the delay, the competition only reached the fifth round before the end of the season. It resumed the following season at the quarter-final stage on 29 September 2021.

FA Women's League Cup

Group stage

Knockout stage 
For the first time in club history, Leicester City reached the knockout stage of the League Cup.

Squad statistics

Appearances 

Starting appearances are listed first, followed by substitute appearances after the + symbol where applicable.

|-
|colspan="14"|Joined during 2021–22 season but competed in the postponed 2020–21 FA Cup:

|-
|colspan="14"|Players who appeared for the club but left during the season:

|}

Transfers

Transfers in

Transfers out

References 

Leicester City W.F.C.